A zirconia light is an intensely brilliant chemical light produced by incandescent zirconia.  It is similar in design to the Drummond light (limelight), but uses a block of zirconia instead of quicklime.  Both have been replaced by the electric light.

Source
 
Types of lamp
Zirconium

References
no author listed (1870)."New Zirconia Light", The Pharmaceutical Journal and Transactions. 29:81-82